State Route 124 (SR 124) is a state highway in the U.S. state of California that runs in Amador County from State Route 88 south of Ione to State Route 16 near Waits Station.

Route description
State Route 124 begins at SR 88 south of the city of Ione. SR 124 continues north as Church Street into the city of Ione, intersecting with Buena Vista Road and passing a lake along the way. Heading northward, SR 124 enters the downtown area of Ione, briefly running concurrently with SR 104 as Main Street before turning northwest as Plymouth Street. In Ione, the route passes a golf club to the west and a reservoir to the north, while heading towards the northeast. SR 124 runs slightly to the northeast as Plymouth Highway, crossing over several creeks, including Mule Creek, and bends slightly towards the east. The highway crosses Horse Creek and Dry Creek, and shortly before re-establishing a northerly route, it passes a mountain known as Rocky Point. SR 124 passes another peak before terminating at SR 16 northwest of Amador City at a T-shaped intersection.

SR 124 is part of the California Freeway and Expressway System, but is not part of the National Highway System, a network of highways that are considered essential to the country's economy, defense, and mobility by the Federal Highway Administration.

Major intersections

See also

References

External links

Caltrans: Route 124 highway conditions
California Highways: Route 124
California @ AARoads.com - State Route 124

124
State Route 124